The Hiram B. Austin House is a historic residence on Mon Louis Island in Mobile County, Alabama, United States.  Situated on the western shore of Mobile Bay, the -story wood-frame structure was built in 1837 in the Gulf Coast Cottage style.  It was placed on the National Register of Historic Places on February 11, 1988.

References

Houses on the National Register of Historic Places in Alabama
Houses completed in 1837
National Register of Historic Places in Mobile County, Alabama
Houses in Mobile County, Alabama
Gulf Coast cottage architecture in Alabama